Upper Paradise is a historic building located west of Bellevue, Iowa, United States.  It is one of over 217 limestone structures in Jackson County from the mid-19th century, of which 101 are houses.  It is one of 12 houses with a hip roof, and it is one of two that are capped with a belvedere.  It was built in 1849 into the side of a hill, so the south elevation has three floors and the north elevation has two.  It features limestone sills and lintels.  Another unusual feature of this house is that it was covered in a thick layer of stucco.  The other stone houses in the county that were stuccoed were only given a thin layer.  The house was listed on the National Register of Historic Places in 1991.

References

Houses completed in 1849
Vernacular architecture in Iowa
Houses in Jackson County, Iowa
National Register of Historic Places in Jackson County, Iowa
Houses on the National Register of Historic Places in Iowa